Carlos Soto is a Honduran judoka. He competed in the men's half-lightweight event at the 1984 Summer Olympics.

References

Year of birth missing (living people)
Living people
Honduran male judoka
Olympic judoka of Honduras
Judoka at the 1984 Summer Olympics
Place of birth missing (living people)